Navojoa Airport or Navojoa National Airport is a small airport located  south of Navojoa, a city located in the Mayo Valley, in the southern part of the Sonora State in Mexico.

It can be accessed via Sonora State Highway 163.

The airport is used solely for general aviation purposes and, in some occasions, as a race track for street racing competitions.

See also
 List of airports in Mexico

References

External links
YouTube video. Street racing at Navojoa Airport Runway.
Street racing at Navojoa Airport.

Airports in Sonora